The Infrared Spatial Interferometer (ISI) is an astronomical interferometer array of three  telescopes operating in the mid-infrared. The signals are converted to radio frequencies through heterodyne circuits and then combined electronically using techniques copied from radio astronomy. ISI is run by the University of California, Berkeley Space Sciences Laboratory. The longest baseline provides a resolution of 0.003 arcsecond at a wavelength of 11 micrometres. On 9 July 2003, ISI recorded the first closure phase aperture synthesis measurements in the mid infrared.

References

External links 
 https://web.archive.org/web/20071215183003/http://isi.ssl.berkeley.edu/

Infrared telescopes
Interferometric telescopes